Simon Thassi ( Šīməʿōn haTassī; died 135) was the second son of Mattathias and thus a member of the Hasmonean family.

Names
The name "Thassi" has a connotation of "the Wise", a title which can also mean "the Director", "the Guide", "the Man of Counsel", and "the Zealous".

History

Simon took a prominent part in the Jewish revolt against the Seleucid Empire led by his brothers, Judas Maccabaeus and Jonathan Apphus. The successes of the Jews rendered it expedient for the Seleucid leaders in Syria to show them special favour. Therefore, Antiochus VI appointed Simon strategus, or military commander, of the coastal region stretching from the Ladder of Tyre to Egypt. As strategus, Simon conquered the cities of Beth-zur and Joppa, garrisoning them with Jewish troops and built the fortress of Adida.

After the capture of Jonathan by the Seleucid general, Diodotus Tryphon, Simon was elected leader by the people, assembled at Jerusalem. He at once completed the fortification of the capital, and made Joppa secure.

At Hadid he blocked the advance of Tryphon, who was attempting to enter the country and seize the throne of Syria. Since Tryphon could gain nothing by force, he demanded a ransom for Jonathan and the surrender of Jonathan's sons as hostages. Although Simon was fully aware that Tryphon would deceive him, both Josephus and 1 Maccabees state that he acceded to both demands so that the people might see that he had done everything possible for his brother. Jonathan was nevertheless treacherously assassinated, and the hostages were not returned. Simon thus became the sole leader of the people.

As an opponent of Diodotus Tryphon, Simon decided to side with the Seleucid king, Demetrius II, to whom he sent a deputation requesting freedom from taxation for the country. The fact that his request was granted implied the recognition of the political independence of Judea.

He became the first prince of the Hebrew Hasmonean Dynasty. He reigned from 142 to 135.

The Hasmonean Dynasty was founded by a resolution, adopted in 141, at a large assembly "of the priests and the people and of the elders of the land, to the effect that Simon should be their leader and high priest forever, until there should arise a faithful prophet". Recognition of the new dynasty by the Roman Republic was accorded by the Senate about 139, when the delegation representing Simon was in Rome. Simon made the Jewish people semi-independent of the Seleucid Empire.

In February 135, Simon and his two sons Mattathias and Judah were assassinated at a banquet at Dok by his son-in-law Ptolemy, the Seleucid governor at Jericho. Simon's third son John Hyrcanus succeeded him to the high priesthood and rule over Israel but proved unable to capture Ptolemy, first because he held John's mother hostage and then because of his army disbanded due to the custom at the time of resting every seventh year.

Legacy
Simon (and its Hebrew form, Simeon) would go on to become the most popular male name for some three centuries afterward in both the Hasmonean Kingdom and Roman Judea. This was both to honor a Jewish hero who had attained independence for the Jewish state, as well as because "Simon" did not sound artificial or strange to Greek ears.

References

|-

2nd-century BCE High Priests of Israel
2nd-century BC Hasmonean rulers
2nd-century BC biblical rulers
2nd-century BC murdered monarchs
Year of birth unknown
Maccabees
135 BC deaths
People in the deuterocanonical books
Founding monarchs